Robert Danny "Dan"  Dryden (July 12, 1944 – August 30, 2016) was an American politician. He was a Republican member of the South Dakota House of Representatives, and represented District 34 from January 11, 2011, until his death.

Early life and education
Born in Hot Springs, South Dakota, Dryden grew up on a ranch in Oelrichs, South Dakota. Dryden went to school in Olerichs, South Dakota. Dryden graduated from Black Hills State University with a bachelor's degree and then graduated from South Dakota State University with a master's degree. Dryden worked for the Rapid City Area School district as the financial officer. Dryden also taught courses in public administration and instruction law at the South Dakota State University.

Elections
2012 Dryden and incumbent Republican Representative David Lust were unopposed for the June 5, 2012 Republican Primary; in the four-way November 6, 2012 General election incumbent Republican Representative David Lust took the first seat and Dryden took the second seat with 6,145 votes (34.18%) ahead of returning 2010 Democratic nominee John Willman and Independent candidate Mike Reardon.
2010 When incumbent Republican Representative Ed McLaughlin was term limited and left the Legislature leaving a District 34 seat open, Dryden ran in the three-way June 8, 2010 Republican Primary and placed second with 1,432 votes (31.43%); in the four-way November 2, 2010 General election incumbent Republican Representative David Lust took the first seat and Dryden took the second seat with 5,638 votes (34.56%) ahead of Democratic nominees Devin Oliver and John Willman.

Death
Dryden died of cancer on August 30, 2016, while still in office.

References

External links
Official page at the South Dakota Legislature
 

1944 births
2016 deaths
People from Hot Springs, South Dakota
Politicians from Rapid City, South Dakota
Black Hills State University alumni
South Dakota State University alumni
South Dakota State University faculty
Republican Party members of the South Dakota House of Representatives
21st-century American politicians